"To Cur with Love" is the eighth episode of the twenty-fourth season of the American animated television series The Simpsons. It originally aired on the Fox network in the United States on December 16, 2012. An alternate cut of this episode was re-aired on December 23, 2012.  It had a few minor changes, including insertion of the Plymptoons couch gag from "Beware My Cheating Bart" that was not included in the original airing. Also, the final Montgomery Burns Explains the "Fiscal Cliff" scene was cut from the original version shown so that the episode still has the same runtime.

Plot
During an event in downtown Springfield, Professor Frink demonstrates a new invention that he soon loses control of, resulting in the destruction of the Springfield Retirement Castle. This results in Grampa moving in with the Simpsons. Meanwhile, Homer discovers an app game called "Villageville" on his MyPad, which involves constructing a village. His immediate addiction to it causes him to ignore Santa's Little Helper and lead to the dog's sudden disappearance. After minutes of searching, they eventually find Santa's Little Helper hidden in a pantry shelf below the sink. Lisa and Bart realize Homer has not paid any attention to the dog all the time. When Homer states that he does not get along with Santa's Little Helper because he is not a "dog person", Grampa mentions about another dog named Bongo, which upsets Homer. It is revealed that Bongo was Homer's childhood dog and best friend (along with Harry Nilsson singing Me and My Arrow from the cartoon The Point, which the animation also imitates, with cross-hatch shading and a more angular style).

Grampa soon reveals that during a kid's fundraiser Mr. Burns was hosting, Burns insulted Homer and Bongo attacked him in retaliation. Hugely upset, Burns demands that Grandpa turn Bongo over to him so that he can have the dog killed. To save Bongo's life, Grandpa sent him to a farm upstate run by a woman named Ms. Viola, but Homer was devastated, leaving Grandpa to suffer both his son's anger and Burns' making him take on a terrible job and awful wardrobe as punishment for not sacrificing Bongo. Back in the present, Homer has still resented Grampa to this day, realizing he will never see Bongo or that Bongo will never remember his old friend. Grampa then shows Homer a picture of an older Bongo resting on an old sweatshirt Homer gave to Bongo when the dog was left to Ms. Viola, proving that Bongo still remembers him. Homer tries to deny the truth but eventually bursts into tears when he realizes that Grandpa did something noble and suffered badly for it, and he immediately makes amends with his father and spends the following night sleeping on the couch with him and Santa's Little Helper, dreaming about himself walking with Santa's Little Helper alongside a younger Homer with Bongo, Burns with his dogs, and Krusty with a gorilla that was the predecessor of Mr. Teeny.

At the end of the episode, Mr. Burns has a sad (for him) conversation with Smithers where they concede that Mitt Romney lost the 2012 Presidential election, and then explains the fiscal cliff in his own words.

Production
The episode was written by Carolyn Omine and directed by Steven Dean Moore. The episode was paired with the short, Montgomery Burns Explains the "Fiscal Cliff" which aired right after the episode ended and right before the closing credits. This short film was not included when the episode had a repeat airing one week later and has sometimes been edited out of airings in syndication due to it becoming outdated.

Reception

Ratings
The episode was watched by a total of 3.77 million viewers, making it, at that point, the lowest-watched episode of the show. In part, this was due to pre-emption by the Sandy Hook Elementary School shooting memorial service, which aired live on most of the East Coast markets.  The show still managed to be Fox's most watched show of the night. That night's new episodes of Family Guy and American Dad! episodes ("Jesus, Mary and Joseph!" and "Minstrel Krampus") were preempted and replaced with reruns of their respective shows ("Grumpy Old Man" and "Wheels and the Legman in: 'The Case of Grampa's Key'"). Fox decided to repeat "To Cur with Love" in the regular timeslot one week later replacing a repeat, while also putting the pre-empted episode of Family Guy and a new episode of American Dad! entitled "National Treasure 4: Baby Franny: She's Doing Well: The Hole Story", unrelated to "Minstrel Krampus", on the air. The repeat was watched by 4.89 million viewers with a 2.1 rating in the 18-49 demographic. This made it the 3rd most watched show in the Animation Domination line up that night, losing out to Family Guy and a repeat of "Gone Abie Gone".

Critical reception
Robert David Sullivan from The A.V. Club gave the episode a C, saying, "This is another trip to the past—without many period trappings to chuckle over—that feels like marking time."

Jasper Goodheart from ShowWatcher wrote "Not a hugely funny episode, but certainly a good one to watch if you want something your Family Guys and South Parks can’t do anywhere near as well as The Simpsons: Make you feel for these characters."

References

External links 
 
 "To Cur with Love" at theSimpsons.com

2012 American television episodes
The Simpsons (season 24) episodes
Television episodes written by Carolyn Omine